John Russell Morrison (born May 2, 1945) is an American former professional basketball player. He played in the American Basketball Association for the Denver Rockets at the beginning of the 1967–68 season.

After the NBA, Morrison became a head coach for Canisius College (1972–74) and an assistant for the ABA's Spirits of St. Louis (1974–76).

References

1945 births
Living people
American men's basketball players
Basketball players from New Jersey
Canisius Golden Griffins men's basketball coaches
Canisius Golden Griffins men's basketball players
College men's basketball head coaches in the United States
Denver Rockets draft picks
Denver Rockets players
Guards (basketball)
Seton Hall Preparatory School alumni
Spirits of St. Louis coaches
St. Louis Hawks draft picks